The 2000 FIM Sidecarcross World Championship, the 21st edition of the competition, started on 19 March and finished after thirteen Grand Prix on 24 September 2000.

The championship was won by Kristers Serģis and his passenger Artis Rasmanis from Latvia, thereby winning their third World Championship together. The pair won the competition with a margin of 32 points, with Dutch rider Daniël Willemsen and his Belgian passenger Sven Verbrugge coming second. Willemsen was the defending champion, having won the 1999 World Championship with his brother Marcel as passenger. Marcel Willemsen was unable to compete in the 2000 edition because of injury. Third place went to the German combination Klaus and Thomas Weinmann. All up, 50 teams were classified in the overall standings with last place going to the Russian team of Anatoli Daineh and Aleksey Bessarabov.
 
The Sidecarcross World Championship, first held in 1980 and organised by the Fédération Internationale de Motocyclisme, is an annual competition. All races, manufacturers, and the vast majority of riders in the competition being in and from Europe. Sidecarcross is similar to motocross except that the teams consist of two riders, a driver and a passenger. Races are held on the same tracks as solo motocross but the handling of the machines differs as sidecars don't lean. The majority of physical work in the sport is carried out by the passenger, who speeds up the sidecarcross in corners by leaning out. The coordination between the driver and the passenger are therefore of highest importance.

Overview
The thirteen races of the season were held in ten countries, Germany (2x), France (2x), Latvia (2x), Estonia, Belarus, Belgium, Sweden, Great Britain, Switzerland and the Netherlands. In comparison to the 1999 edition which had twelve Grand Prix, the Grand Prix of the Greece, Czech Republic and Ukraine had been dropped from the calendar while the GP's of Belarus and Sweden had been added and both France and Germany receiving a second Grand Prix.

Events typically consist of a qualifying competition, held in multiple stages on Saturdays of a race weekend while the two race events are typically held on Sundays. One exception to this rule is Easter weekends, when the races are held on Easter Monday. Race weekends can consist of additional motocross or quart support races as well, but the FIM stipulates that the World Championship races have priority. Riders have to be provided with at least one 30 minute free practice session, which will be timed. A race can consist of up to 30 starters and the qualifying modus is dependent on the number of entries. Up to 32 entries, it will be held in one group split into two sessions of 30 minutes each. Above 32 entries, the starter field will be sub-divided into two groups through ballot and the current standings. Each qualifying group can consist of up to 30 racers. Should there be more than 60 entries, a pre-qualifying has to be held. Of the riders in the two groups, the top-twelve directly qualify for the races. The remaining teams then go to a second-chance qualifying, in which the best six advance. The riders placed seventh and eighth remain in reserve should one of the qualified teams not be able to participate.

The points system used in 2000 was the same as had been in use since 1984 with the best fifteen teams receiving points in every race and the race winner receiving 20 points. It was the last time this system was used, with changes being made to it in 2002 and, again, in 2003:

Retirements
At the end of the 2000 season a number of long-term competitors retired from the World Championship, the most successful of those being German Alois Wenninger, runners-up in 1997 and active since 1992.

Calendar
The calendar for the 2001 season:

 Flags for passengers not shown.

Classification

Riders
The top ten teams in the final overall standings were:

 Equipment listed is motor and frame.

References

External links
 The World Championship on Sidecarcross.com
 The John Davey Grand Prix Pages – Results of all GP's up until 2005
 Official FIM website – Sidecar Motocross World Championship

Sidecarcross world championship, 2000
Sidecarcross World Championship seasons